Anita T. Layton is an applied mathematician who applies methods from computational mathematics and partial differential equations to model kidney function. She presently holds a Canada 150 Research Chair in Mathematical Biology and Medicine at the University of Waterloo. She is also a professor in the university's Department of Applied Mathematics. She joined the Waterloo faculty in 2018. Previously, she was the Robert R. & Katherine B. Penn Professor of Mathematics at Duke University, where she also held appointments in the department of biomedical engineering and the department of medicine.

Early life and education
Layton was born in Hong Kong, where her father was a secondary school mathematics teacher. She did her undergraduate studies at Duke, entering with the plan of studying physics but eventually switching to computer science and graduating in 1994. She went to the University of Toronto for her graduate studies, and completed a Ph.D. there in 2001. Her dissertation, High-Order Spatial Discretization Methods for the Shallow Water Equations, concerned numerical weather prediction, and was jointly supervised by Kenneth R. Jackson and Christina C. Christara.

Research
Layton's main research interest is the application of mathematics to biological systems. She works with physiologists and clinicians to formulate detailed computational models of kidney function, which she uses to understand the impacts of diabetes and hypertension on kidney function, and the effectiveness of novel therapeutic treatments. With Aurélie Edwards, Layton is the author of Mathematical Modeling in Renal Physiology (Springer, Lecture Notes on Mathematical Modelling in the Life Sciences, 2014).

Recognition
In 2018, Layton was awarded the Canada 150 Research Chair, and then joined the University of Waterloo, Department of Applied Mathematics. Layton is the 2021 winner of the Krieger–Nelson Prize of the Canadian Mathematical Society., a 2021 winner of the Top 100 Most Powerful Women in Canada by the Women’s Executive Network, and a 2022 Fellow of the Association for Women in Mathematics.

See also
 List of University of Waterloo people

References

Year of birth missing (living people)
Living people
20th-century American mathematicians
21st-century American mathematicians
Hong Kong mathematicians
American women mathematicians
Canadian women mathematicians
Duke University alumni
Duke University faculty
Academic staff of the University of Waterloo
20th-century women mathematicians
21st-century women mathematicians
20th-century American women
21st-century American women